The ELPA Rally was a rally competition held in the Chalkidiki peninsula in Greece. The rally was organised by the Automobile and Touring Club of Greece (ELPA) and was the second most important rally event in Greece after the Acropolis Rally. The first edition was held in 1976 under the name Chalkidiki Rally. Since 1977 the rally was regular part of the European Rally Championship. The 2011 edition of the rally was cancelled due to financial reasons and was never revived since.

Previous winners
Sourced from 

Notes:
 - The 2003 event was canceled after one stage due to fatal accident involving local driver Dimitris Kolopianos, who was killed instantly in the crash.
 - In the 2008 edition there were two separate ELPA Rally events - ELPA Rally I and ELPA Rally II
 - Ioannis Papadimitriou set the fastest overall time, but he was registered only for the national championship and not for the European Rally Championship, so therefore Giandomenico Basso is recognised as the official rally winner by the FIA.
 - Armodios Vovos set the fastest overall time, but he was registered only for the national championship and not for the European Rally Championship, so therefore Yuriy Protasov is recognised as the official rally winner by the FIA.
 - The 2011 event was canceled for economic reasons.

References

External links
 The official website for the rally
 ELPA website

Rally competitions in Greece
European Rally Championship rallies